The 2014–15 Persian Gulf Pro League (formerly known as Iran Pro League) was the 32nd season of Iran's Football League and 14th as Persian Gulf Pro League since its establishment in 2001. Foolad were the defending champions. The season featured 13 teams from the 2013–14 Persian Gulf Cup and three new teams promoted from the 2013–14 Azadegan League: Padideh as champions, Naft Masjed Soleyman and Paykan. The league started on 1 August and ended on 15 May 2015. Sepahan won the Pro League title for the fifth time in their history (total fifth Iranian title).

Changes

Rules and regulations
The Iranian Football Clubs who participate in 2014–15 Persian Gulf Pro League were allowed to have up to maximum 35 players (including up to maximum 4 non-Iranian players) in their player lists, which categorized in the following groups:
 Up to maximum 18 adult (without any age limit) players
 Up to maximum 9 under-23 players (i.e. the player whose birth is after 1 January 1992).
 Up to maximum 8 under-21 players (i.e. the player whose birth is after 1 January 1994).

Teams

Stadia and locations

Number of teams by region

Personnel and kits

Note: Flags indicate national team as has been defined under FIFA eligibility rules. Players may hold more than one non-FIFA nationality.

Managerial changes

League table

Results

Positions by round

Clubs season-progress

Relegation play-off

Esteghlal Khuzestan as 14th-placed team will faced Play-off winner of 2014–15 Azadegan League, Mes Kerman in a two-legged Play-off.

Esteghlal Khuzestan won 3–0 on aggregate and retained its place in the next edition of the Persian Gulf Pro League

Season statistics

Top Goalscorers 

 Last updated: 15 May 2015 
Source: Soccerway.com

Top Assistants 

 Last updated: 15 May 2015 
Source: Iplstats.com

Hat-tricks

Clean Sheets 

Last Update: 15 May 2015

Scoring 

First goal of the season: Saman Nariman Jahan for Tractor Sazi against Foolad (1 August 2014)
Fastest goal of the season: 11 seconds, Mohammad Reza Khalatbari for Sepahan against Gostaresh (10 December 2014)
Latest goal of the season: 97 minutes and 5 seconds, Ahmad Hassanzadeh for Saba Qom against Padideh (14 August 2014)
Largest winning margin: 4 goals
Saipa 4–0 Padideh (19 September 2014)
Highest scoring game: 8 goals
Esteghlal Khuzestan 4–4 Esteghlal (11 December 2014)
Zob Ahan 5–3 Naft Tehran (16 April 2015)
Most goals scored in a match by a losing team: 3 goals
Zob Ahan 5–3 Naft Tehran (16 April 2015)

Awards

Team of the Season

Goalkeeper: Alireza Beiranvand (Naft Tehran)
Defence: Ramin Rezaian (Rah Ahan), Leandro Padovani (Naft Tehran), Leonard Mesarić (Foolad), Vouria Ghafouri (Sepahan)
Midfield: Ghasem Haddadifar (Zob Ahan), Omid Ebrahimi (Esteghlal), Andranik Teymourian (Esteghlal/Tractor Sazi)

Attack: Sajjad Shahbazzadeh (Esteghlal), Edinho (Tractor Sazi), Mehdi Taremi (Perspolis)

Player of the Season

Ghasem Haddadifar was awarded as the best player of the season among Andranik Teymourian became second. Amir Arsalan Motahari was also awarded as the best young player of the season.

Other awards

Hossein Faraki was awarded as the best coach of the season.
Mehdi Taremi won the best striker award.

Attendance

Average home attendance

Attendance by round

Notes:Updated to games played on 15 May 2015. Source: Iranleague.ir  Matches with spectator bans are not included in average attendances Gostaresh played their match against Tractor Sazi at Sahand  Paykan played their matches against Esteghlal and Persepolis at Takhti Tehran  Rah Ahan played their matches against Esteghlal and Persepolis at Takhti Tehran

Highest attendances

Notes:Updated to games played on 15 May 2015. Source: Iranleague.ir

See also 
 2014–15 Azadegan League
 2014–15 Iran Football's 2nd Division
 2014–15 Iran Football's 3rd Division
 2014–15 Hazfi Cup
 Iranian Super Cup
 2014–15 Iranian Futsal Super League

References

External links
 2014–15 Persian Gulf Cup at PersianLeague
 2014–15 Persian Gulf Cup at Soccerway

Iran Pro League seasons
Iran
1